Assads may refer to,

Al-Assad family
Assads, Morocco

See also
 Assad (disambiguation)